Ilama or ilama may refer to:
 Ilama (fruit), a tropical tree and fruit
 Ilama, Honduras, a municipality
 Ilama culture, an archaeological culture of Colombia
 Farlen Ilama, Costa Rican football player

See also 
 Llama (disambiguation)